Wilfred Williams (December 28, 1910 – October 12, 1972) was an American singer. He had a successful cover recording of Fats Waller's "I'm Gonna Sit Right Down And Write Myself A Letter" in 1957. The record sold over one million copies, and was awarded a gold disc. His trademark hook for his songs was to shout "Oh, Yeah" at the end of lyrics.

Early years
A Methodist minister's son, Williams was born in Waco, Texas. His early youth was spent in Texas, before the family moved to Ohio. Growing up, he sang in choirs at churches where his father was the pastor, with his mother often serving as choir director. He was often a soloist, and he also learned to help her arrange music.

Military service 
Williams served in the Army during World War II; he received a medical discharge in 1944.

Career
While he was a student at Wilberforce University, Williams became the lead singer of the Charioteers; he went on to sing with the group from 1930 to 1950, when he formed his own Billy Williams Quartet with Eugene Dixon, Claude Riddick and John Ball. Many radio and television appearances followed: as regular guests and chorus on the extremely popular Bing Crosby radio show [50 million listeners] from 1942 to 1946 and   Your Show of Shows with Sid Caesar.

On April 5, 1959, the Billy Williams Quartet appeared on The Ed Sullivan Show and performed a rousing version of "Goodnight Irene".

Williams also headed the Billy Williams Revue, "a complete show package of dancers, singers, musicians and comedians." The troupe performed in Canada, in the Caribbean, and across the United States.

Later years
By the early 1960s Williams struggled to retain his voice due to complications of diabetes. He subsequently moved to Chicago and sang on WGN-TV's "All Time Hits" TV show (for which videotape exists). In the years before his death, Williams worked in New York City with a program to help homeless men.

Personal life
Williams was married to the former Lois Traverse, and they had two children, Sharon and Leslie. In 1957, Mrs. Williams had charges of desertion and non-support against him dismissed after the two reached a financial support agreement. The case was heard in Bergen County, New Jersey.

Death
On October 12, 1972, Williams died in Chicago, Illinois, after having a heart attack. He was 61 years old.

Discography

Charted singles

References

External links 
The Charioteers, The Quartet, and Billy Williams 

1910 births
1972 deaths
People from Waco, Texas
Singers from Texas
Burials at Burr Oak Cemetery
Wilberforce University alumni
20th-century African-American male singers